Matteus or variation, may refer to:

People
 , a Swedish name, the equivalent of "Matthew"
 Matteus (footballer), Matteus Oliveira Santos (born 1989), Brazilian soccer player
  (1898–1981), Swedish politician with the surname Berglund
  (born 2001), Swedish ice hockey player during the 2020–21 HockeyAllsvenskan season
 Marko-Matteus Lange, Estonian record setting swimmer
 Arnold Matteus (1897–1986), Estonian architect

Places
 , several churches in Sweden; see List of churches in Sweden
 St Matteus kyrka, Vasastaden, Stockholm, Sweden
 Matteus, Stockholm City Centre, Stockholm, Sweden; a region of Stockholm divided into two districts, Eastern and Western

See also
 
 Mateus (disambiguation)
 Matthew (disambiguation)